The National Historic Landmarks in Michigan represent Michigan's history from pre-colonial days through World War II, and encompasses several landmarks detailing the state's automotive, maritime and mining industries. There are 43 National Historic Landmarks (NHL) in the state, located in 18 of its 83 counties. The landmarks also cover sites of military significance, such as Fort Michilimackinac, religious significance, such as the St. Ignace Mission, and cultural significance, such as the Fox Theater and Ernest Hemingway's boyhood summer cottage. In addition, two previously designated landmarks have lost that status due to the demolition of the sites.

The National Historic Landmark Program is administered by the National Park Service, a branch of the Department of the Interior. The National Park Service determines which properties meet NHL criteria and makes nomination recommendations after an owner notification process. The Secretary of the Interior reviews nominations and, based on a set of predetermined criteria, makes a decision on NHL designation or a determination of eligibility for designation. Both public and privately owned properties can be designated as NHLs. This designation provides indirect, partial protection of the historic integrity of the properties via tax incentives, grants, monitoring of threats, and other means. Owners may object to the nomination of the property as a NHL. When this is the case the Secretary of the Interior can only designate a site as eligible for designation.

All NHLs are also included on the National Register of Historic Places (NRHP), a list of historic properties that the National Park Service deems to be worthy of preservation. The NHLs in Michigan comprise approximately 2% of the 1,757 properties and districts listed on the National Register of Historic Places in Michigan as of January 2012. The primary difference between a NHL and a NRHP listing is that the NHLs are determined to have national significance, while other NRHP properties are deemed significant at the local or state level.

Wayne County, the location of the automotive capital Detroit, has the most NHLs, with 13, followed by Emmet County and Mackinac County with three each. Five counties have two each, and eight counties each have one listing. Michigan's first NHLs were designated on October 9, 1960, when three locations were chosen. The latest designation was made on January 13, 2021. Eleven Historic Landmarks in Michigan are more specifically designated National Historic Landmark Districts, meaning that they cover a large area rather than a single building.

Current NHLs in Michigan

 Numbers represent an ordering by significant words.  Different colors, defined here, differentiate the National Historic Landmark Districts from other NHL buildings, structures, sites or objects.

|}

NHLs formerly located in Michigan
The following Landmarks were located in Michigan at the time they were declared National Historic Landmarks, but have since moved to other states.

|}

Former NHLs in Michigan

See also

 List of Michigan State Historic Sites
 List of Michigan State Historic Markers
 Detroit Historical Museum
 Michigan Department of History, Arts and Libraries
 Michigan History magazine
 List of U.S. National Historic Landmarks by state

References

External links

 National Historic Landmark Program at the National Park Service
 Lists of National Historic Landmarks

Michigan
 
National Historic Landmarks
National Historic Landmarks